Atrophoderma refers to conditions involving skin atrophy.

Types include:
 Follicular atrophoderma
 Linear atrophoderma of Moulin
 Atrophoderma of Pasini and Pierini

References

Dermatologic terminology